The 1941 UK & Ireland Greyhound Racing Year was the 16th year of greyhound racing in the United Kingdom and Ireland.

Summary
The year was dominated by the effects of World War II. The remaining classic races that had not been suspended in 1940 were duly suspended in 1941 with the exception of the Irish Greyhound Derby and Scottish Greyhound Derby.

Racing did continue at many venues but was restricted to afternoons during the winter, this is because of the blackout regulations and during the summer the meetings were held in the early part of the evening. Matinee meetings would also take place on weekends at some tracks. Staffing the racing worsened as many of the stadium and kennel staff were called up to serve.

Remarkably despite restrictions on racing then annual totalisator turnover set a new record, reaching £42,027,642 and with a tax of 6% was a significant income for the government.

Competitions
Trainer Joe Harmon continued his successful run of big race wins by training Lights O'London who won the Scottish Derby. Ballycurreen Soldier reached his third consecutive Scottish Derby final under the training of a third different trainer. The event was completed in one evening, with heats at 7:35 pm and 7:55 pm and the final later at 9:45 pm. The principal London races remaining on the open race calendar were The Cambridgeshire, Wimbledon Spring Cup, Wimbledon Gold Cup, Wembley Gold Cup and Two Year Old Produce Stakes, also at Wimbledon.

Ballynennan Moon, now with Sidney Orton won the Wembley Summer Cup in August quickly followed by the Berkeley Cup and was beginning to come to prominence as the nation's leading greyhound. However, with no English Greyhound Derby taking place this brindle dog would never have the opportunity to claim the sport's biggest prize.

Ireland
Iris racing suffered from the dreaded Foot-and-mouth disease; traveling almost ceased and the Irish tracks came to a standstill in many areas. The ban was finally lifted at the end of the summer and hectic plans were drawn up to save the Irish Derby before the year ended. This resulted in a late October slot for the competition and would be run at Shelbourne Park because Cork Greyhound Stadium had ruled themselves out from being able to stage the race. Harold's Cross Stadium also managed to stage the Grand National at late notice, which went down well with the Irish Coursing Club, who had noted that both Dublin tracks had come to the rescue. The Grand National title went to The Gunner.

News
The Irish Greyhound Derby winner Brave Damsel, owned by John Byrne and The Gunner, were both sold to England. The Gunner was bought by a syndicate in Oxford for the sum of £400 and would become a crowd favourite at the relatively Oxford Stadium because of his hurdling ability.

Roll of honour

Tracks opened

Totalisator Returns

The totalisator returns declared to the licensing authorities for the year 1941 are listed below. Tracks that did not have a totalisator in operation are not listed.

References 

Greyhound racing in the United Kingdom
Greyhound racing in the Republic of Ireland
UK and Ireland Greyhound Racing Year
UK and Ireland Greyhound Racing Year
UK and Ireland Greyhound Racing Year
UK and Ireland Greyhound Racing Year